Colin Teague (1839) was a missionary and part of the American Colonization Society's settlement efforts in Africa. He was a member of the First Baptist Church in Richmond, Virginia.

Born a slave, he eventually bought his freedom and worked as a saddlemaker. He was recruited along with Lott Cary to establish a colony on the west African coast for resettlement of the growing population of freed slaves in the U.S. A missionary, he worked to establish a Baptist church in the colony of Liberia and to recruit native inhabitants. His son Hilary Teague became a prominent pastor, businessman, newspaper editor, and political leader in Liberia.

Efforts to establish a colony in Liberia proved difficult. Indigenous people refused to work for the colonists and securing building supplies was rough in the hot and buggy climate. Teague reportedly expressed an interest in abandoning the effort.

He was married to Frances Teage. The family emigrated to West Africa in 1821 to help establish the colony of former slaves and other African Americans with support from the U.S. government, Christian organizations and slaveholders. The effort was criticized by other groups including many free Blacks.

References

1780 births
1839 deaths
American colonization movement
18th-century American slaves
People from Richmond, Virginia
Baptists from the United States
19th-century Baptists